= TennisConnect =

TennisConnect is a software application introduced by the non-profit Tennis Industry Association in 2004.

The Association developed TennisConnect in response to market research that said the Associatioln was not using current technology to connect with tennis.

Since its introduction, TennisConnect has been used by more than 500,000 tennis players who combine to produce more than 12 million page views per month. Tennis Providers have independently published more than 20,000 pages, 600,000 events, and 18 million tennis court reservations using TennisConnect.

As of 2004, TennisConnect was the foundation of the Association database architecture.
